{{DISPLAYTITLE:C23H24O12}}
The molecular formula C23H24O12 (exact mass: 492.12677623) may refer to:
 5,2',3'-Trihydroxy-7,8-dimethoxyflavone 3'-glucoside (CAS number 113963-38-5)
 5,2',6'-Trihydroxy-6,7-dimethoxyflavone 2'-glucoside (CAS number 168293-27-4)
 6-Hydroxykaempferol 3,6-dimethyl ether 7-glucoside (CAS number 32214-79-2)
 6-Hydroxyluteolin 6,3'-dimethyl ether 7-glucoside (CAS number 25474-11-7)
 6-Hydroxyluteolin 6,4'-dimethyl ether 7-glucoside (CAS number 67557-77-1)
 6-Hydroxyluteolin 6,7-dimethyl ether 4'-glucoside (CAS number 41087-98-3)
 6-Hydroxyluteolin 7,3'-dimethyl ether 6-glucoside (CAS number 60032-93-1)
 8-Hydroxyluteolin 8,3'-dimethyl ether 7-glucoside (CAS number 135043-85-5) 
 Aurantio-obtusin beta-D-glucoside (CAS number 129025-96-3)
 Betuletol 3-galactoside (CAS number 128450-83-9)
 Betuletol 3-glucoside (CAS number 144599-04-2)
 Betuletol 7-glucoside (CAS number 158080-75-2)
 Burkinabin A (CAS number 720682-37-1)
 Burkinabin B (CAS number 720682-38-2)
 Burkinabin C (CAS number 720682-39-3)
 Caryatin 7-glucoside (CAS number 151590-52-2)
 Coccinoside A (CAS number 146555-76-2)
 Dillenetin 7-glucoside (CAS number 165460-83-3)
 Eupalitin 3-galactoside (CAS number 98604-37-6)
 Eupalitin 3-glucoside (CAS number 83117-60-6)
 Eupatolin (CAS number 29725-50-6)
 Homotectorigenin 7-O-glucoside (CAS number 41744-53-0)
 Hypolaetin 7,3'-dimethyl ether 4'-glucoside (CAS number 215113-46-5)
 Iristectorigenin A 7-O-glucoside (CAS number 37744-61-9)
 Iristectorigenin B 7-O-glucoside (CAS number 94396-09-5)
 Isopyrenin (CAS number 61252-85-5)
 Isothymusin 8-glucoside (CAS number 205682-11-7)
 Lagotiside (CAS number 123914-42-1)
 Licoagroside A (CAS number 325144-71-6)
 Limocitrin 3-rhamnoside (CAS number 90456-56-7)
 Okanin 4'-(6"-acetylglucoside) (CAS number 120163-15-7)
 Ombuin 3-galactoside (CAS number 69168-13-4)
 Ombuin 3-glucoside (CAS number 158642-42-3)
 Prudomenin (CAS number 24568-40-9)
 Quercetin 3,3'-dimethyl ether 4'-glucoside (CAS number 89648-74-8)
 Quercetin 3,3'-dimethyl ether 7-glucoside (CAS number 2345-97-3)
 Quercetin 3,4'-dimethyl ether 7-glucoside (CAS number 70324-45-7)
 Myricetin 3',4'-dimethyl ether 3-rhamnoside (CAS number 362603-38-1)
 Quercetin 3,7-dimethyl ether 5-glucoside (CAS number 128388-46-5)
 Quercetin 3,7-dimethyl ether 4'-glucoside (CAS number 102693-70-9)
 Quercetin-5,3'-dimethyl ether-3-glucoside (CAS number 74378-36-2)
 Rhamnazin 3-galactoside (CAS number 59359-34-1)
 Rhamnazin 3-glucoside (CAS number 20486-38-8)
 Rhamnazin 4'-glucoside (CAS number 80651-75-8)
 Syringetin 3-rhamnoside (CAS number 93126-00-2)
 Tricin 4'-glucoside (Tricin-4'-O-beta-D-glucopyranaoside, CAS number 71855-50-0)
 Tricin 5-glucoside (Tricin 5-O-beta-D-glucopyranoside, CAS number 32769-00-9)
 Tricin 7-O-glucoside (Tricin 7-O-beta-D-glucopyranoside, CAS number 32769-01-0)